Arohanam (meaning, Ascent) is a Malayalam-language political satire novel written by V. K. N. in 1969. V. K. N. himself translated the novel into English under the title Bovine Bugles. The author follows his trademark style in this novel which mercilessly attacks the Indian politics of the 1960s. The novel won the Kerala Sahitya Akademi Award in 1970.

References

1969 novels
20th-century Indian novels
Malayalam novels
Indian satirical novels
Novels set in Kerala
Kerala Sahitya Akademi Award-winning works
DC Books books
1969 Indian novels